The term Greek Orthodox Church (Greek: Ἑλληνορθόδοξη Ἐκκλησία, Ellinorthódoxi Ekklisía) has three meanings. The broader meaning designates "the entire body of Orthodox (Chalcedonian) Christianity, sometimes also called 'Eastern Orthodox,' 'Greek Catholic,' or generally 'the Greek Church. The narrower meaning designates "any of several independent churches within the worldwide communion of (Eastern) Orthodox Christianity that retain the use of the Greek language in formal ecclesiastical settings".  The third is the Church of Greece, the Eastern Orthodox church operating within the modern borders of Greece.

Etymology 
Historically, the term "Greek Orthodox" has been used to describe all Eastern Orthodox churches, since the term "Greek" can refer to the heritage of the Byzantine Empire. During the first eight centuries of Christian history, most major intellectual, cultural, and social developments in the Christian Church took place in the Byzantine Empire or its sphere of influence, where the Greek language was widely spoken and used for most theological writings. The empire's capital, Constantinople, was an early important center of Christianity, and its liturgical practices, traditions, and doctrines were gradually adopted throughout Eastern Orthodoxy, still providing the basic patterns of contemporary Orthodoxy. Thus, Eastern Orthodox came to be called "Greek" Orthodox in the same way that Western Christians came to be called "Roman" Catholic. However, the appellation "Greek" was abandoned by the Slavic and other Eastern Orthodox churches as part of their peoples' national awakenings, beginning as early as the 10th century A.D. Thus, by the early 21st century, generally only those churches most closely tied to Greek or Byzantine culture and ethnicity were called "Greek Orthodox" in common parlance.

Greek Orthodoxy has also been defined as a religious tradition rooted in preserving the Greek identity.

History 
The Greek Orthodox churches are descended from churches which the Apostles founded in the Balkans and the Middle East during the first century A.D., as well as maintenance of many ancient church traditions.

Churches

The four ancient patriarchates:
 The Ecumenical Patriarchate of Constantinople, headed by the Ecumenical Patriarch of Constantinople, who is also the "first among equals" of the Eastern Orthodox Church
 The semi-autonomous Archdiocese of Crete
 The Greek Orthodox Archdiocese of Thyateira and Great Britain
 The Greek Orthodox Archdiocese of Italy
 The Greek Orthodox Archdiocese of America
 The Greek Orthodox Archdiocese of Canada
 The Greek Orthodox Archdiocese of Australia
 The Greek Orthodox Church of Alexandria
 The Greek Orthodox Church of Antioch
 The Greek Orthodox Church of Jerusalem
 The autonomous Church of Sinai

 Autocephaly defended at the Council of Ephesus
The Church of Cyprus

 Two modern autocephalous churches:
 The Church of Greece
 The Albanian Orthodox Church also known as "Greek Orthodox Church of Albania" or "Church of Albania"

See also 

 East–West Schism
 Ecumenical Patriarchate of Constantinople 
 Eastern Orthodox Church
 History of the Eastern Orthodox Church
 Russian Orthodoxy
 Armenian Apostolic Church
 Name days in Greece
 Pentarchy
 Ecumenism
 Greeks

References

Further reading
 Aderny, Walter F. The Greek and Eastern Churches (1908)  online
 Constantelos, Demetrios J. Understanding the Greek Orthodox church: its faith, history, and practice (Seabury Press, 1982)
 Fortesque, Adrian. The Orthodox Eastern Church (1929)
 Hussey, Joan Mervyn. The orthodox church in the Byzantine empire (Oxford University Press, 2010) online
 Kephala, Euphrosyne. The Church of the Greek People Past and Present (1930)
 Latourette, Kenneth Scott. Christianity in a Revolutionary Age, II: The Nineteenth Century in Europe: The Protestant and Eastern Churches. (1959) 2: 479–484; Christianity in a Revolutionary Age, IV: The Twentieth Century in Europe: The Roman Catholic, Protestant, and Eastern Churches (1958)

External links 
 

    

 
Eastern Orthodoxy in Europe
Christian terminology
Orthodoxy Church
Christian groups in the Middle East